Al Husun (also Romanized as Al Husn, Hisn and Husn) is a town in northern Jordan, located  north of Amman, and about  south of Irbid. It has a population of 35,085. The region has fertile soil which along with the moderate climate allows the growing of high quality crops. Al Husn was known for its wine; now its main products are wheat and olive oil. Al Husn is registered in Jordanian government documents with the spelling 'Al Husun', and it is the administrative center of the Bani Obaid district.

History

Al Husn is one of the possible sites of Dion, a city dating from when the Romans occupied northern Jordan and the region. The Decapolis cities (a ten-city Greco-Roman federation, or league, created under Pompey about 64-63 BCE). According to Pliny the Elder, (CE 23-79)  the cities included: Scythopolis (Bet She'an), Hippos (Susieh), Gadara (Umm Qais), Pella (Tabaqat Fahl), Philadelphia (Amman),  Gerasa (Jerash), Dion, Kanatha (Kanawat), Damascus, and Raphana (Abila).

Al Husn has one of the oldest Orthodox churches in Jordan. It was originally built in the second century (CE), but destroyed in 1680 by the Ottoman army. A church was later rebuilt in 1886 by the local Christians. Traditionally, Al Husn has been home to a relatively large Christian community, including Melkites; Al Husn, along with Fuhais, still includes a high percentage of Christians.

In 1596 it appeared in the Ottoman tax registers named as al-Husun, situated in the nahiya (subdistrict) of   Bani Atiyya, part of the Sanjak of Hawran. It had 24 households and 15 bachelors; all Muslim. The villagers paid a fixed tax-rate of 25% on agricultural products; including wheat, barley, summer crops/fruit trees, goats and bee-hives; in addition to occasional revenues. The total tax was 17,153 akçe. 1/4 of the revenue went to a waqf.

In 1806, the German traveler named Seetzen arrived in Husn and became a guest of Al Sheikh Abdalla Ghanma. He narrates in his book, which describes his travels in the east, that when he got to Al Husn Pond and asked about the town's sheikh, he was directed to Abdalla’s residence, where he stayed with him for two weeks.

In 1812, the Swiss tourist and discoverer of Petra, Johann Ludwig Burckhardt, arrived in Husn. He also became a guest of Sheikh Abdalla Ghanma for ten days. Both these early travelers wrote about their stay in Husn and about their host; the description is full of compliments, appreciation and respect.

In 1838 Al Husn's inhabitants were predominantly Sunni Muslims and Greek Christians.

In 1961 the population of Husn was 3,728 inhabitants, of whom 2,030 were Christians.

Sights
Al Husn is notable for its Roman-era artificial hill, situated in the northern part of the town, referred to by locals as "Al-Taal". The Taal used to be the property of the Nusairat family; it was later taken over by the Jordanian government. Local legend says there are "castle ruins" or a Byzantine church within the tell which gave the town its name; "Husn" means "castle" in Arabic. The hill is approximately 200 meters high and 800 meters in diameter.

See also
 Husn Camp

References

Bibliography

External links
 Photos of Al-Husn at the American Center of Research

Populated places in Irbid Governorate